Tom Flannery (born July 12, 1966) is an American singer-songwriter and playwright from Scranton, Pennsylvania, United States. AllMusic has called him "one of the most gifted songwriters to emerge at the turn of the century."

Career
After three critically acclaimed albums (1998's Song About a Train, The Anthracite Shuffle in 2000, and 2002's solo acoustic Drinking With Nick Drake) he started the website Songaweek.com with friend and fellow songwriter Lorne Clarke as a venue to release all his new music digitally. In the five years between 2003 and 2008 he recorded and made available at least one brand new song per week, frequently writing about current events. The Anthracite Shuffle, a concept album dealing with the history of coal mining in Northeastern Pennsylvania, was inspired by a 1996 journey to Houston which Flannery found strikingly flat and level compared to his mountainous home.

In 2005 he contributed a solo acoustic version of the song "Boom Boom Mancini" to a Warren Zevon tribute album called Hurry Home Early: The Songs of Warren Zevon. Splendid Magazine called the performance "bone-chilling.....(it) marks the disc's pinnacle. Whereas Zevon's versions paint Mancini as a modern-day folk hero, Flannery's haunting vocal delivery gives the boxer's story a terrifying, stone-cold killer interpretation."

In 2006 he co-wrote the soundtrack for the award winning feature length documentary Facing Sudan.  In addition, he contributed several songs in 2008 for the short documentary Crayons and Paper, a followup to Facing Sudan.

Connections Magazine called his 2009 release Pete Townshend's Ghost "dark and expressive, glorious and sobering… A delicately haunting slice of passion-laden songwriting. …Immediate and gripping, akin to sitting in a living room at the feet of grizzled troubadours like Steve Earle or Bruce Springsteen, soaking in the wisdom of a life perhaps not so clean but still crying out for redemption."

His produced plays include The Driveway (directed by Pulitzer Prize winning dramatist and Academy Award-nominated actor Jason Miller), God Bless Roy Campanella, Spanish Lady: Reflections on 1918 , God and the Ghost of Woody Guthrie, The Katrina Monologues, Marcinkus and The Last Thoughts of Gino Merli. In September 2007 The Last Thoughts of Gino Merli was adapted into a PBS documentary called Gino Merli: The Healing Hero.

In 2012 he released a full band record called Teen Angst and the Green Flannel, a song cycle written from the perspective of a 17-year-old boy. OurTownRadio.net wrote that "“This is bona-fide rock n' roll soul food. “Teen angst and the green flannel” kicks in the door as well as anything done by the stooges and the who in their primes.."

His latest release is 2012's Love and Streets, a collection of solo acoustic tracks.

Discography

Solo
Studio albums
Song About a Train (1998)
The Anthracite Shuffle (2000)
Drinking With Nick Drake (2002)
Civil War Battle Ballads (2008)
Teen Angst and the Green Flannel (with the Shillelaghs) (2012)
Love and Streets (2012)
Peace and Love and Dollar Pints (2019)

Plays

Marcinkus
The Last Thoughts of Gino Merli
The Driveway
Beckett and Ernie
Spanish Lady: Reflections on 1918
Fight Like Hell Till You Get to Heaven
Screwing Agnes
God Bless Roy Campagnella
Mary on the Backboard
Colorblind; The Katrina Monolouges
Men Who Hug in Bars
Hands in the Dark
The Flying Girls

References

External links

American male singer-songwriters
20th-century American dramatists and playwrights
American folk musicians
American film score composers
American male film score composers
Living people
1966 births
Writers from Scranton, Pennsylvania
Singer-songwriters from Pennsylvania
American male dramatists and playwrights
20th-century American male writers